Peter Hugoe Matthews, FBA (born 1934) is a British linguist and historian of linguistics. He is a fellow of St John's College, Cambridge, and was formerly Professor and Head of the Department of Linguistics at the University of Cambridge (1980–2000). He was elected a Fellow of the British Academy in 1985.

Matthews is perhaps best known for his writings on linguistic morphology. He has published two monographs on the subject.

Matthews was an early follower of Noam Chomsky, but lost enthusiasm for the "generative enterprise" during the 1960s. He has described the Chomskyan revolution as "the Best Thing that has happened to linguistics in the past 2500 years". But he also writes, that dominance of various Chomskyan ideas is not "a Good Thing, and I would not be disappointed if my study of their origins were to lead more scholars to question them".

Selected publications
 Inflectional Morphology: A theoretical study based on aspects of Latin verb conjugation (1972)
 Morphology: An introduction to the theory of word-structure (1974, 2nd revd edition 1991)
 Generative Grammar and Linguistic Competence (1979)
 Syntax (1981)
 Grammatical Theory in the United States from Bloomfield to Chomsky (1993)
 A Short History of Structural Linguistics (2001)
 Linguistics: A Very Short Introduction (2003)
 The Concise Oxford Dictionary of Linguistics (2005)
 Syntactic Relations: A Critical Survey (2007)
 The Positions of Adjectives in English (2014)

References

1934 births
Living people
Linguists from the United Kingdom
Fellows of St John's College, Cambridge
Fellows of the British Academy
Morphologists
Syntacticians